The VP8 Image Analyzer is an analog computer produced by Pete Schumacher of Interpretations Systems Incorporated (ISI) in 1972. It has been used to image the Shroud of Turin. The VP8 makes a brightness map of whatever data it processes - white appears to be higher in elevation, black appears lower and mid-range appears between these two extremes.  

When the device was used with photographs or paintings, the result was a distorted and inaccurate representation of the original image. However, the Shroud image produced an accurate three-dimensional representation of the Man of the Shroud, with facial features, arms, legs and chest all contoured correctly. This was shown to Peter Schumacher, the inventor of the device, and he later recalled his astonishment:

"I had never heard of the Shroud of Turin before that moment. I had no idea what I was looking at. However, the results are unlike anything I have processed through the VP-8 Analyzer, before or since. Only the Shroud of Turin has produced these results from a VP-8 Image Analyzer isometric projection study."

References

Analog computers
Shroud of Turin